Fabrikant is a surname typical to Russian Jews:
 Anat Fabrikant, olympic sailor
 Janika Fabrikant, French-Swiss painter
 Sara Irina Fabrikant, Swiss geographer
 Valentin Fabrikant, scientist
 Valery Fabrikant, former associate professor of mechanical engineering

See also 
 Fabricant (disambiguation)